Oryza is a genus of plants in the grass family. It includes the major food crop rice (species Oryza sativa and Oryza glaberrima).

Oryza is situated in tribe Oryzeae, which is characterized morphologically by its single-flowered spikelets whose glumes are almost completely suppressed. In Oryza, two sterile lemma simulate glumes. The tribe Oryzeae is in subfamily Ehrhartoideae,  a group of Poaceae tribes with certain features of internal leaf anatomy in common. The most distinctive leaf characteristics of this subfamily are the arm cells and fusoid cells found in their leaves.

One species, Asian rice (O. sativa), provides 20% of global grain and is a food crop of major global importance. The species are divided into two subgroups within the genus.

Species
Inside the genus Oryza, species can be divided by their genomes types. Species of the same genome type cross easily, while hybridizing different types requires techniques like embryo rescue.

Over 300 names have been proposed for species, subspecies, and other infraspecific taxa within the genus. Published sources disagree as to how many of these should be recognized as distinct species. The following follows the World Checklist maintained by Kew Garden in London.
 Oryza australiensis (EE) – Australia
 Oryza barthii (AA) – tropical Africa
 Oryza brachyantha (FF) – tropical Africa
 Oryza coarctata (KKLL) – India, Pakistan, Bangladesh, Myanmar
 Oryza eichingeri (CC) – tropical Africa, Sri Lanka
 Oryza glaberrima (AA) – African rice – tropical Africa
 Oryza grandiglumis (CCDD) – Brazil, Venezuela, Fr Guiana, Colombia, Peru, Bolivia
 Oryza latifolia (CCDD) – Latin America + West Indies from Sinaloa + Cuba to Argentina
 Oryza longiglumis (HHJJ) – New Guinea
 Oryza longistaminata (AA) – Madagascar, tropical + southern Africa
 Oryza meyeriana (GG) – China, Indian Subcontinent, Southeast Asia
 Oryza minuta (BBCC) – Himalayas, Southeast Asia, New Guinea, Northern Territory of Australia
 Oryza neocaledonica (GG) – New Caledonia
 Oryza officinalis (CC) – China, Indian Subcontinent, Southeast Asia, New Guinea, Australia
 Oryza punctata (BB) – Madagascar, tropical + southern Africa
 Oryza ridleyi (HHJJ) – Southeast Asia, New Guinea
 Oryza rufipogon (AA) – brownbeard or red rice – China, Indian Subcontinent, Southeast Asia, New Guinea, Australia
 Oryza sativa (AA) – Asian rice – China, Indian Subcontinent, Japan, Southeast Asia; naturalized many places
 Oryza schlechteri (HHKK) – New Guinea

Formerly included
Many species now regarded as better suited to other genera:
Echinochloa
Leersia
Maltebrunia
Potamophila
Prosphytochloa
Rhynchoryza

See also
 Specialized metabolism in Oryza

References

 
Poaceae genera
Taxa named by Carl Linnaeus